The Rheinische Kantorei is a German vocal ensemble of baroque music accompanied by an instrumental ensemble called Das Kleine Konzert.

History 
The Rheinische Kantorei and Das Kleine Konzert were founded in 1977 by the German conductor Hermann Max.

This vocal ensemble has between twelve and thirty-two singers.

It has worked with soloists such as soprano Barbara Schlick, tenors  and Christoph Prégardien and basses Gotthold Schwarz and Stephen Varcoe.

Its repertoire is mainly Renaissance and Baroque but also includes classical and romantic works.

The ensemble intensively explores the repertoire of representatives of the different generations of the Bach family: 

 Johannes Bach, Heinrich Bach, Johann Michael Bach
 Johann Sebastian Bach, Johann Ernst Bach, Johann Ludwig Bach
 Wilhelm Friedemann Bach, Carl Philipp Emanuel Bach, Johann Christian Bach, Johann Christoph Friedrich Bach
 Wilhelm Friedrich Ernst Bach

It also focuses on Johann Sebastian Bach's predecessors (Franz Tunder, Philipp Heinrich Erlebach, Christoph Bernhard, Johann Caspar Ferdinand Fischer), to his contemporaries (Johann Friedrich Fasch, Gottfried Heinrich Stölzel, Christoph Graupner) as well as to later Baroque composers (Johann Adolf Hasse, Carl Heinrich Graun, Carl Ditters von Dittersdorf, Gottfried August Homilius).

Recording (selection) 
 1981: Cantata Mache dich auf, werde licht by Johann Ludwig Bach
 1987: Cantatas Wq239, Wq249, Wq243, Wq217, Wq250, Wq222 and Wq251 by Carl Philipp Emanuel Bach
 1988: Die Auferstehung und Himmelfahrt Jesu Wq 240 and Gott hat den Herrn auferweckt Wq 244 by Carl Philipp Emanuel Bach
 1988: Cantatas Klopstocks Morgengesang am Schöpfungsfeste, Auf, schicke dich recht feierlich Anbetung dem Erbarmer and Heilig and Carl Philipp Emanuel Bach
 1988: Cantatas Zur Einführung des H.P.Gasie, Wer ist so würdig als du and Der Herr lebt by Carl Philipp Emanuel Bach
 1988: Geistliche Kantaten by Carl Philipp Emanuel Bach, Johann Christoph Altnickol, Georg Benda
 1989: Oratorio Die Kindheit Jesu by Johann Christoph Friedrich Bach
 1990: Cantatas Pygmalion, Die Amerikanerin and Ino by Johann Christoph Friedrich Bach
 1990: Israelsbrünnlein by Johann Hermann Schein
 1990: Passionsoratorium by Johann Ernst Bach
 1990: Missa brevis eand motet Deus judicium tuum by Georg Philipp Telemann
 1991: Cantatas Die Tageszeiten and Daran ist erschienen die Liebe Gottes by Georg Philipp Telemann
 1993: Cantatas Lasset uns ablegen die Werke der Finsternis anf Es ist eine Stimme eines Predigers in der Wüste by Wilhelm Friedemann Bach
 1994: Cantatas Dies ist der Tag and Erzittert und fallet by Wilhelm Friedemann Bach
 1995: Cantatas Der Herr ist König anf Die Donnerode by Georg Philipp Telemann
 1998: Trauermusik by Johann Ludwig Bach
 1998: Messe in D by Johann Adolf Hasse
 1999: Kantata Es begab sich, daß Jesus in eine Stadt mit Namen Nain ging by Christoph Graupner
 1999: Weihnachtsoratorium by Carl Heinrich Graun
 2000: Kantate Cassandra by Johann Christoph Friedrich Bach
 2000: Friedens Cantata by Johann Michael Bach
 2000: Cantates & Symphonies Columbus by Johann Michael Bach
 2001: Oratorium Gesù al Calvario by Jan Dismas Zelenka
 2001: Oratorium Giob by Karl Ditters Von Dittersdorf
 2002: Oratorium Gioas – Rè di Giuda by Johann Christian Bach
 2002: Serenata eroica by Georg Philipp Telemann
 2003: Geistliche Konzerte by Franz Tunder
 2004: Geistliche Harmonien by Christoph Bernhard
 2005: Die Könige in Israel by Ferdinand Ries
 2007: Kapitänsmusik von 1738 by Georg Philipp Telemann
 2008: Große Passion Kommt her und schaut by Carl Heinrich Graun
 2010: Weihnachtskantaten by Christoph Graupner

References

External links 
 
 
 

Early music orchestras
Baroque music groups
German orchestras
German choirs